Eugene Humphrey Kingsale (born August 20, 1976) is an Aruban former Major League Baseball player with the Baltimore Orioles, Seattle Mariners, San Diego Padres, and Detroit Tigers from  until . At six-foot-three, and his weight ranging from 170 to 194 pounds, Kingsale is known as a slick fielding, speedy switch-hitter who throws right-handed, he has played extensively for the Netherlands national team in international competition, including the World Cup of Baseball, the 2004 Olympics in Athens, Greece as well as the World Baseball Classic tournaments in 2006 and 2009. Since 2008, he has played for perennial champions Neptunus Rotterdam in the Dutch Hoofdklasse, as well as being a key member of the Dutch national team, which played in Beijing Olympics.

Major League Baseball Transactions
Kingsale was signed by the Baltimore Orioles as an amateur free agent on June 19, 1993. He made his debut with the Orioles on September 3, 1996. On July 10, 2001, he was selected off waivers by the Seattle Mariners. On June 14, 2002, he was selected off waivers by the San Diego Padres. On November 15, 2002, he was traded to the Detroit Tigers for Mike Rivera and became the Tigers' opening day center fielder. On September 29, 2003, he was granted free agency and signed with the San Diego Padres on November 9 of that year. Kingsale only had 134 hits in the major leagues but did collect a single off Hall of Famer Pedro Martinez on September 27, 1999.

Since 2003, Kingsale has been out of the Major League Baseball and currently playing for Dutch baseball giants Neptunus as well as the Netherlands national baseball team where he is a key performer.

Gene Kingsale currently lives in the Netherlands.

World Baseball Classic

In the qualifying round of the 2009 World Baseball Classic, Kingsale drove in the tying run and scored the winning run in the 11th inning to lead the Netherlands to a 2–1 win over the Dominican Republic.

Career statistics
During Kingsale's 7 major league seasons, he played in 211 games with 533 career at bats. He scored 65 runs, had 134 hits with three home runs and 53 RBI. He had a career .251 batting average and had 15 stolen bases. In 2005, he played for the Double-A Bowie Baysox and Triple-A Ottawa Lynx in the Orioles' farm system.

Interesting facts
On September 3, 1996, Kingsale became the first ballplayer born in Aruba to appear in a major league game. He made his debut just five days earlier than fellow Aruban Calvin Maduro.
 Was decorated with an Order of Orange-Nassau, in the grade Knight, in 2004 along with other major league players Calvin Maduro and Sidney Ponson in a ceremony in Oranjestad, Aruba.
 Was introduced while with the Bowie Baysox of the Eastern League as "Sir Eugene Kingsale".
Kingsale, along with several other players was a part of the "Aruba Mafia" that the Orioles scouted.

External links

Neptunus Honkbal

1976 births
2006 World Baseball Classic players
2009 World Baseball Classic players
Aberdeen IronBirds players
Aruban expatriate baseball players in the United States
Baseball players at the 2004 Summer Olympics
Baseball players at the 2008 Summer Olympics
Baltimore Orioles players
Bluefield Orioles players
Bowie Baysox players
Gulf Coast Orioles players
Detroit Tigers players
Dutch people of Aruban descent
Dutch expatriate baseball players in Canada
Frederick Keys players
Knights of the Order of Orange-Nassau
Living people
Major League Baseball outfielders
Major League Baseball players from Aruba
Olympic baseball players of the Netherlands
Ottawa Lynx players
Portland Beavers players
Rochester Red Wings players
San Diego Padres players
Seattle Mariners players
Tacoma Rainiers players
Toledo Mud Hens players
Aruban people of African descent